William John (Jack) Copley (born 23 September 1906 in Ipswich, Queensland - died 21 April 1975 in Brisbane, Queensland) was an Australian trade union activist and politician. Copley was the Labor member of the Queensland state Parliament for the electoral district of Bulimba from 1932 to 1938.

References

1906 births
1975 deaths
20th-century Australian politicians
Members of the Queensland Legislative Assembly
Australian Labor Party members of the Parliament of Queensland